Sir Norman Thomas Gilroy  (22 January 1896 – 21 October 1977) was an Australian bishop. He was the first Australian-born cardinal of the Roman Catholic Church.

Early life and priestly ministry

Gilroy was born in Sydney, to working-class parents of Irish descent. Educated at the Marist Brothers' College in the Sydney suburb of Kogarah, he left school when 13 years old, to work as a messenger boy in what was then the Postmaster-General's Department. In 1914 his parents refused permission for him to enlist in the Australian Army, but he was allowed to volunteer for the transport service as a telegraphist. He left Australia in February 1915 and served in the Gallipoli campaign of World War I in 1915 as a naval wireless operator on the Hessen off Gallipoli and Imbros.

After his return to Australia in August 1915, he was ordered to resume his work as a telegraphist for the postal service. He expressed an interest in becoming a priest and began his studies at St Columba's,  in 1917, and continued them from 1919 at the Urban College in Rome. He was ordained a priest for the Diocese of Lismore on 24 December 1923 at the Basilica di San Giovanni in Laterano in Rome by Archbishop Filippo Bernardini C.Ss.R., and received his doctorate in divinity in Rome the following year.

Returning to Australia in 1924, Gilroy was appointed to the staff of the Apostolic Delegation in Sydney, which in that year received as its new head Archbishop Bartolomeo Cattaneo, who favoured the appointment of Australian-born priests as bishops in Australia.

Episcopal ministry

In December 1934, he was appointed Bishop of Port Augusta, South Australia, gaining an experience in dealing with pastoral problems that was to serve him well in his later position. He received episcopal consecration on St. Patrick's Day 1935 with Archbishop Filippo Bernardini as principal consecrator.

In 1937, he became Coadjutor Archbishop of Sydney and Titular Archbishop of Argyranthemum. On the death of Archbishop Michael Kelly, Gilroy succeeded to the Archdiocese of Sydney on 18 March 1940.

Gilroy was created a cardinal on 18 February 1946, and was assigned the title of becoming cardinal-priest of Santi Quattro Coronati, becoming the first Australian-born member of the College of Cardinals.

On 11 January 1953 he laid the cornerstone of the National Shrine of Our Mother of Perpetual Help, Philippines.

Gilroy was knighted in 1969. He was the first Roman Catholic cardinal to receive a knighthood since the English Reformation. He was named Australian of the Year in 1970. He resigned as Archbishop of Sydney in July 1971 and died in Sydney in 1977, aged 81. He was succeeded by James Darcy Freeman.

As Archbishop Gilroy enforced strict discipline in accordance with the Code of Canon Law on his clergy, who had grown lax under the elderly Kelly. In so doing, he acquired a reputation of an "iron man". He always maintained his exacting standards but showed compassion for those who failed to meet them.

Much of his energy was devoted to providing churches and schools for his flock. By 1971, he had 366 schools with 115,704 pupils, staffed by 751 religious brothers and 2,992 nuns as well as lay teachers.

The 1954 split of the Australian Labor Party saw a marked difference of opinion between Gilroy and Archbishop Daniel Mannix of Melbourne, who backed B. A. Santamaria's "Movement" (the episcopally sponsored Catholic Social Studies Movement). Gilroy avoided direct political comment and believed that the Church should not become involved in politics. However, like most other Sydney Irish Roman Catholics, he had grown up as a supporter of the Australian Labor Party. Moreover, he was a confidant of Roman Catholic Labor Premier of New South Wales Joseph Cahill. He firmly opposed Santamaria's activities and banned the distribution of his movement's literature in Sydney churches. As a result of the close relationship between Gilroy and Cahill, there was no split in the New South Wales Labor Party, as there had been in Victoria and Queensland.

In 2017 the first extended biography of Gilroy was published to coincide with the 40th anniversary of the Cardinal's death. The author, John Luttrell FMS has been praised for his "fresh research...and a genuine portrait of the man who rose from postal clerk to prince of the Church."

Legacy
Gilroy College, a Year 7–12 high school in north-western Sydney named after him opened in 1980. The college took Gilroy's personal motto, "Christ is my light", as the official school motto. Gilroy College celebrated its 25th anniversary as a school community in 2004.

References

External links
 Cardinal Gilroy on the online Australian Dictionary of Biography
 Norman Thomas Gilroy war diaries, February 2-October 7, 1915 (digitised)

1896 births
1977 deaths
20th-century Roman Catholic archbishops in Australia
Australian cardinals
Australian military personnel of World War I
Cardinals created by Pope Pius XII
Australian Knights Commander of the Order of the British Empire
Australian of the Year Award winners
Roman Catholic archbishops of Sydney
Burials at St Mary's Cathedral, Sydney
Participants in the Second Vatican Council
Pontifical Urban University alumni
Roman Catholic bishops of Port Augusta
Australian Roman Catholic archbishops
People from Glebe, New South Wales